Janusz Pawłowski (born 20 July 1959 in Sopot) is a retired male judoka from Poland.  He competed at the 1980 Summer Olympics, and won the bronze medal in the Men's Half-Lightweight (–65 kg) division.

He also competed at the 1988 Summer Olympics in Seoul, South Korea. There he advanced to the final by defeating Japan's 1987 world champion Yosuke Yamamoto in the semi-final and took the silver medal in the Men's Half-Lightweight (–65 kg) division after a match with no point earned by either side. Referees' decision in the final gave the win to South Korea's Lee Kyung-Keun.

After his retirement from competition judo, he had been working as a national coach in Poland, Kuwait, Italy, and Slovenia. Currently, he is working as the head judo coach at a private judo club in Turin, Italy.

On 29 June 2013 he became part of the Polish Sport Hall of Fame and received his own bronze star on the street of Olympic training center in Cetniewo, Poland.

See also 

 Judo in Canada
 Judo in Poland
 List of Canadian judoka

References

External links

 
 
 

1959 births
Living people
Polish male judoka
Judoka at the 1980 Summer Olympics
Judoka at the 1988 Summer Olympics
Olympic judoka of Poland
Olympic silver medalists for Poland
Olympic bronze medalists for Poland
People from Sopot
Olympic medalists in judo
Sportspeople from Pomeranian Voivodeship
Medalists at the 1988 Summer Olympics
Medalists at the 1980 Summer Olympics
20th-century Polish people